Wayne Haensel (May 21, 1936 – November 22, 2012) was an American football player and coach. He served as the head football coach at South Dakota State University in Brookings, South Dakota from 1982 to 1990, compiling a record of 45–52. Haensal was selected by the New York Giants in the 1958 NFL Draft and participated in off-season tryouts with the Saskatchewan Roughriders of the Canadian Football League (NFL).

Head coaching record

College

References

1936 births
2012 deaths
American football tackles
South Dakota State Jackrabbits football coaches
South Dakota State Jackrabbits football players
High school football coaches in Iowa
High school football coaches in South Dakota
People from Walnut Grove, Minnesota
Players of American football from Minnesota